Daniel Nestor and Nenad Zimonjić successfully defended their title, defeating Bob and Mike Bryan in the final, 7–6(9–7), 6–7(3–7), 7–6(7–3), 6–3, to win the gentlemen's doubles title at the 2009 Wimbledon Championships.

Seeds

  Bob Bryan /  Mike Bryan (final)
  Daniel Nestor /  Nenad Zimonjić (champions)
  Lukáš Dlouhý /  Leander Paes (first round)
  Mahesh Bhupathi /  Mark Knowles (quarterfinals)
  Bruno Soares /  Kevin Ullyett (quarterfinals)
  Mariusz Fyrstenberg /  Marcin Matkowski (first round)
  Max Mirnyi /  Andy Ram (third round)
  Łukasz Kubot /  Oliver Marach (quarterfinals)
  Wesley Moodie /  Dick Norman (semifinals)
  Travis Parrott /  Filip Polášek (second round)
  Marcelo Melo  /  André Sá (second round)
  Jeff Coetzee /  Jordan Kerr (second round)
  František Čermák /  Michal Mertiňák (second round)
  Rik de Voest /  Ashley Fisher (first round)
  Martin Damm /  Robert Lindstedt (third round)
  Stephen Huss /  Ross Hutchins (first round)

Qualifying

Draw

Finals

Top half

Section 1

Section 2

Bottom half

Section 3

Section 4

References

External links

2009 Wimbledon Championships – Men's draws and results at the International Tennis Federation

Men's Doubles
Wimbledon Championship by year – Men's doubles